Monirah El-Mahdiyyah (born Zakiyyah Hesin Mansur) was an Egyptian singer born in 1885 (she is said to have come from Zagazig, but other sources say Alexandria); she died in 1965. The singer, better known under the nickname of "Soltanet El-Tarab" or "The Soltana", was considered to be the leading Egyptian singer in the 1920s.

Career 
She studied in a French nuns’ school, after which she began her career in singing in local clubs in the Azbakiyyah entertainment area.

She joined the theatre of Aziz Eid, known for encouraging and developing the talents of his actors, actors who have among them many future stars such as Fatma Roshdi. This is where she acquired her acting technique and her lyrical talent as an actress and singer.  She also was part of the ensemble of Salama Higazi and when he became ill, she sang his role in Salah al-Din al-Ayubi, while dressed onstage as a man.

Her first recording was in 1906, under the name Sett Monirah (Lady Monirah).She sang Arabic musical repertoire and also Arab adaptations of popular Italian operas, her performances became very popular and increasingly demanded by the public.  She interpreted some male roles as Romeo and Mark Antony.

She was a trailblazer and not afraid to express nationalist sentiments where she performed.  She was later followed in the field by such actresses as Bahiga Hafez, Fatma Roshdi and Aziza Amir.  Her performances marked the increasingly popularity of new and lighter song formats, for instance, the taqtuqa, which she sang for women and theater audiences.  However, Mounira al-Mahdiya was also proficient in the singing of adwar and qasa'id which she sang for male audiences.

The great popularity of Mounira al-Mahdiya, intensified by the success of the film La Coquette in 1935, enabled her to build a network of fans from different backgrounds, both social and geographical, and a theatre now bears her name.

She sang for kings and leaders in national celebrations such as "National Day of Turkey" in front of Kemal Atatürk.

Hasan El-Emam directed a film, Soltanet El-Tarab about her life, produced by and starring the artist Sherifa Fadel. The film appeared in 1978 (https://www.imdb.com/title/tt3528408/)

Monirah El-Mahdiyyah died on March 12, 1965, at the age of eighty years after a long professional life.

Filmography 
 1935: La Coquette (El Ghandourah) stars Monirah El-Mahdiyyah and Ahmed Allam Directed by Mario Volpi

Important works 
 Asmar Malak Rohi= Brown Owned My Soul
 Yamamah Helwah = Sweet Dove. 
 Erkhi El Setarah = Down The Curtain
 Ba'd El Esha Yehla El Hezar W El Farfasha = After Supper Sweet Kidding And Freshness
 Ana Hawet =I loved 
 Ta'ala B El Agal= Come Rapidly

Awards 
 1926 Award  of excellence in theatrical singing contest set up by the Ministry of Public Works
 1960 won the Medal of Merit First Class
 1961 First Class of the Egyptian National Award Order of Arts and Sciences

Honours 
Monirah El-Mahdiyyah was honoured by the King of Morocco and President of Tunisia and by the President of Turkey Kemal Atatürk — She was the only artist that he admired.

See also 
 List of Egyptians
 منيرة المهدية

References

External links 
 To Listen to her song Baad El Eisha Yehla El Hezar We El Farfasha
  TV Interview with Mounira El Mahdeya

1885 births
1965 deaths
20th-century Egyptian women singers